Kaunia is a genus of South American shrubs or small trees in the family Asteraceae. Its range is centered in Bolivia but it is also found in Argentina, southern Brazil, Peru and Ecuador.

Genus is named for Edward Kaun of Baltimore, Maryland, USA.

 Species

References 

 
Asteraceae genera
Flora of South America
Taxonomy articles created by Polbot